The 2010 season in Estonian football, started January 2010 and ended December 2010:

Honours

Official titles

Other competition winners

Domestic results

2010 Meistriliiga

Qualification play-off

Estonian Cup

2009–10

2010–11

2010 Supercup

National team results

Notes

 
Seasons in Estonian football